The Samlakki tree frog (Litoria capitula) is a species of frog in the subfamily Pelodryadinae. It is endemic to Indonesia. Its natural habitats are subtropical or tropical dry forests.

References

Litoria
Amphibians described in 1968
Taxonomy articles created by Polbot